Nass Camp is a settlement in British Columbia, Canada. Nass Camp is north-east of Prince Rupert, British Columbia, Canada.

Climate
Nass Camp experiences a continental climate (Köppen Dfb) with some maritime influence due to its proximity to the Pacific Ocean.

References

Settlements in British Columbia